This is a comprehensive list of all releases by the alternative singer Cathy Davey.

Albums

Studio albums

Singles

Music videos

References

External links
 

Discographies of Irish artists
Folk music discographies